Pierre Paul Lucien Salvat Etchepare (2 October 1891 – 20 April 1943) was a French actor.

Pierre Etchepare was born in Paris and died in Neuilly-sur-Seine, Hauts-de-Seine.

Selected filmography
 Happy Couple (1923)
 My Aunt from Honfleur (1923)
 Let's Get Married (1931)
 The Man in Evening Clothes (1931)
 You Will Be a Duchess (1932)
 Mademoiselle Josette, My Woman (1933)
 Paprika (1933)
 The Lover of Madame Vidal (1936)
 La Garçonne (1936)
 Lady Killer (1937)
 Champions de France (1938)
 The Train for Venice (1938)

External links

1891 births
1943 deaths
French male film actors
French male silent film actors
Male actors from Paris
20th-century French male actors